The 2021 World Archery Championships was held from 20 to 26 September 2021 in Yankton, United States.

Medals table

Medals summary

Recurve

Compound

References

External links
 Results Book

World Archery Championships
2021 World Archery Championships
World Championships
World Archery Championships
Archery Championships
Archery in the United States
World Archery Championships
World Archery Championships